Thomas Fabbiano was the defending champion but chose not to defend his title.

Yoshihito Nishioka won the title after defeating Vasek Pospisil 6–4, 7–5 in the final.

Seeds

Draw

Finals

Top half

Bottom half

References
Main Draw
Qualifying Draw

Gimcheon Open ATP Challenger - Singles
2018 Singles